The 2014 Guzzini Challenger Doubles was a professional tennis tournament. Ken Skupski and Neal Skupski were the defending champions but decided not to participate.

Ilija Bozoljac and Goran Tošić won the final, beating James Cluskey and Laurynas Grigelis 5–7, 6–4, [10–5]

Seeds

  Guillermo Durán /  Máximo González (first round)
  Ariel Behar /  Alessandro Motti (quarterfinals)
  Jamie Delgado /  Gilles Müller (quarterfinals)
  Victor Baluda /  Sergio Galdós (semifinals)

Draw

Draw

References
 Main Draw

Guzzini Challenger- Doubles
2014 Doubles